The 1959 Liège–Bastogne–Liège was the 45th edition of the Liège–Bastogne–Liège cycle race and was held on 26 April 1959. The race started and finished in Liège. The race was won by Fred De Bruyne of the Peugeot team.

General classification

References

1959
1959 in Belgian sport